Augustus Charles Reeves (1911–1996) was an Australian rugby league footballer who played as a er in the 1930s.

Background
Reeves was born in Glebe, New South Wales, Australia on 29 October 1911.

Playing career
A flying winger that had great speed, Reeves was a regular in first grade for Balmain in the late 1930s, scoring 8 tries in 13 first grade appearances between 1935–1936. Reeves played for Balmain in the 1936 Grand Final

Post playing
Reeves later became a physical instructor in the Australian Army in 1941.

Death
Reeves died on 11 June 1996, age 84.

References

1911 births
1996 deaths
Australian rugby league players
Balmain Tigers players
Rugby league wingers
Rugby league players from Sydney